was a town located in Imizu District, Toyama Prefecture, Japan.

As of 2003, the town had an estimated population of 10,108 and a density of 1,269.85 persons per km². The total area was 7.96 km².

On November 1, 2005, Ōshima, along with the city of Shinminato, the towns of Daimon and Kosugi, and the village of Shimo (all from Imizu District), was merged to create the city of Imizu and no longer exists as an independent municipality.

Dissolved municipalities of Toyama Prefecture
Imizu, Toyama